Tirupattur Ramaseshayyer Venkatachala Murti (June 15, 1902 – March 1986) was an Indian academic, philosopher, writer and translator. He wrote several books on Oriental philosophy, particularly Indian philosophy and his works included commentaries and translations of Indian and Buddhist texts. He was an elected honorary member of the International Association of Buddhist Studies (IABS), a society promoting scholarship in Buddhist studies. Studies in Indian Thought: Collected Papers, Central Philosophy of Buddhism and A Study of the Madhyamika System are some of his notable works. The Government of India awarded him the third highest civilian honour of the Padma Bhushan, in 1959, for his contributions to education and literature.

Murti dedicates his 1955 work, THE CENTRAL PHILOSOPHY OF BUDDHISM, as follows: "To my revered teacher Professor S. Radhakrishnan".

Selected bibliography

See also 
 Poola Tirupati Raju
 M. Hiriyanna

References 

Recipients of the Padma Bhushan in literature & education
1902 births
1986 deaths
20th-century Indian philosophers
Indian male writers
20th-century Indian translators